is a passenger railway station located in the town of Kaiyō, Kaifu District, Tokushima Prefecture, Japan. It is operated by JR Shikoku and has the station number "M25".

Lines
Only local trains stop at the station.

Layout
The station consists of a side platform serving a single track. There is no station building, only a shelter on the platform for passengers. The access road slopes up steeply from the main road, giving direct access to the platform.

Adjacent stations

History
On 1 April 1987, with the privatization of JNR, control of the station passed to JR Shikoku.

Passenger statistics
In fiscal 2019, the station was used by an average of 4 passengers daily.

Surrounding area
Japan National Route 55

See also
 List of Railway Stations in Japan

References

External links

 JR Shikoku timetable

Railway stations in Tokushima Prefecture
Railway stations in Japan opened in 1973
Kaiyō, Tokushima